Henri Christiaan Pieck (19 April 1895, in Den Helder – 12 January 1972, in The Hague) was a Dutch architect, painter and graphic artist.

Pieck married twice.  On 12 July 1922, he married Geziena van Gelder, with whom he had one son. This union was dissolved on 14 May 1928.  His second wife, Bernharda Hugona Johanna van Lier, whom he married on 25 May 1928 in St. Giles, England, bore him two daughters.  Pieck was the twin brother of Anton Franciscus Pieck, another Dutch painter and graphic artist.

Political activity

During the 1930s, Pieck operated as an agent for Soviet intelligence under Ignace Reiss.  During this time he cultivated friendship with several British Foreign Office clerks, including Captain John H King, who handed over to Pieck many telegrams, code books and other Foreign Office correspondence 

After being arrested on 9 June 1941 for resistance activities, Pieck spent the rest of World War II in German custody, first in the "Oranjehotel" (a detention center used at the beginning of the war by the Dutch as a POW camp that was later taken over by the Germans), after which he was deported to Buchenwald via the Nazi transit camp in Amersfoort.

Pieck was assigned to the “Never-Never Shipment,” sparing him from being killed at Auschwitz because of SS officials’ desire to have him produce paintings that they could sell to their acquaintances for high prices.

Sources

Further reading
 Biografisch Woordenboek van het Socialisme en de Arbeidersbeweging in Nederland ("Biographical Dictionary of Socialism and the Workers Movement in The Netherlands") 
 The “Oranjehotel” website

External links
 les deux femmes, 1914

1895 births
1972 deaths
Dutch architects
Dutch communists
People from Den Helder
Dutch resistance members
Buchenwald concentration camp survivors
Soviet spies
20th-century Dutch painters
Dutch male painters